Girl Overboard were a pop rock band formed in 1985 as Separate Tables by Lisa Schouw a contralto on lead vocals, Robin Gist on guitar, and  Brett McNaughton on keyboards with an expanded line-up, they changed their name. Girl Overboard released two albums: Paint a Picture  (March 1990) and Go in 1993.  The group split up in late 1993.

History

1983-1988: Founding
In 1983, future member of Girl Overboard, Lisa Schouw (born 5 March 1958 - 2 October 2020) joined as a vocalist for a Melbourne band, Pointz, where she worked alongside Robin Gist on guitar. Over two years they changed their name to Short Story, played around the town, and started negotiating a publishing and recording deal with Wheatley Records. However, the band fell apart before being signed. Schouw returned to New Zealand for six months, and returned to Australia to meet Gist and write songs. After auditioning various players they settled on keyboard player, Brett McNaughton, and together the three formed Separate Tables in 1985, initially using a drum machine.

Separate Tables' line-up was augmented by Lee Davidson on drums, Dean Hilson on saxophone and Jenny Milroy on backing vocals and percussion. They released an independent single, "Long Dark Night" backed with "Wrap Your Arms Around Me". After a year the band secured a recording deal with RCA/BMG and were a support act for John Farnham's Jack's Back Tour. They had a management contract with the Neil Clugston Organisation. Separate Tables promoted their single, "When the Word Came Down" (December 1987), by playing entertainment centres, concert halls and pubs around Australia. Their next single "Change My Sex" (May 1988) was largely ignored by radio. John Favaro joined on bass guitar and another single, "Wrap Your Arms Around Me" (February 1989), was released.

1989-1992: Paint a Picture
The band began recording their debut album, Paint a Picture, with producer Ross Fraser at Metropolis Studios in Melbourne. At the ARIA Music Awards of 1989 Fraser won Producer of the Year for his work on "When the Word Came Down" by Separate Tables, Farnham's Age of Reason and the State's "Real Love". At the same ceremony Doug Brady won Engineer of the Year for his work on "Change My Sex" and "When the Word Came Down" by Separate Tables and additional works for other artists.

The name changed to Girl Overboard with the release of the next single, "I Can't Believe" (October 1989). Schouw explained to The Canberra Times''' Kathryn Whitfield, why they changed, "We were playing pubs and were making a lot more noise and the name didn't describe the band, we are more emotional more energetic than that, so we became Girl Overboard." Whitfield observed, "Schouw, Gist and McNaughton have worked together on all the band's songs and though they all lean personally toward different musical styles they seem to reach perfect accord on the band's style." "I Can't Believe" was nominated for Breakthrough Artist – Single at ARIA Music Awards of 1990. A subsequent single, "The Love We Make" (January 1990), peaked at No. 23 on the ARIA Singles Chart. They toured Australia to promote Paint a Picture, which reached No. 18 on the ARIA Albums Chart. According to Australian musicologist, Ian McFarlane, "[their] sound was a safe mix of dance pop, light jazz and American-styled hard rock." They followed with a trip to United States and United Kingdom in 1991 to write new material, and "meet with song publishers and our record company." Fraser won another ARIA Award for his production work for Girl Overboard (and other artists) in 1991.
 
1993: Go and break up
The band's second album, Go (1993), was recorded with producer, Charles Fisher, who provided an overall sense of cohesion while new drummer, Tony Day, had replaced Davidson. It provided the singles, "Chain of Fools", "Your Love", and "Jackie". Go and its singles were less successful on the charts and some band members became disillusioned. McFarlane felt, "[they] offered lushly textured pop with Schouw's rich contralto well to the fore." The band broke up late in 1993.
 
Death
Lead vocalist Schouw died from cancer on 2 October 2020, aged 62 and was honoured at the ARIA awards

 Members 
 Lisa Schouw – vocals (d. 2020)
 Robin Gist – guitar
 Brett McNaughton – keyboards
 Lee Davidson – drums (album: Paint a Picture), Tony Day (Album Go)
 Jenny Milroy – backing vocals, percussion
 John Favaro – bass guitar
 Tony Day – drums
 John Farnham On Somethings Never Change''

Discography

Studio albums

Singles

Awards and nominations

ARIA Music Awards
The ARIA Music Awards is an annual awards ceremony that recognises excellence, innovation, and achievement across all genres of Australian music. They commenced in 1987.

! 
|-
| rowspan="2"| 1990
| "I Can't Believe"
| ARIA Award for Breakthrough Artist - Single
| 
| rowspan="2"| 
|-
| Doug Brady for "I Can't Believe" by Girl Overboard
| ARIA Award for Engineer of the Year
| 
|-
| rowspan="2"| 1991
| "Permanent Friend" 
| ARIA Award for Best Video
| 
| rowspan="2"| 
|-
| Ross Fraser  for "The Love We Make" by Girl Overboard
| ARIA Award for Producer of the Year
| 
|-

References

External links
 
  Entry for Lisa Schouw
 

Australian pop rock groups
Musical groups established in 1985
Musical groups disestablished in 1993
1985 establishments in Australia
1993 disestablishments in Australia